Alfredo Brilhante da Costa, best known as Brilhante (November 5, 1904 – June 8, 1980) was a Brazilian football central defender. He was born in Rio de Janeiro.

During his career (1924–1933), he played in Bangu and in Vasco da Gama. He won the Rio de Janeiro State Championship in 1924 and 1929. For the Brazil national team, he participated at the 1930 FIFA World Cup, playing one match, against Yugoslavia. He died at 75 years old.

Honours

Club
 Campeonato Carioca (2): 
Vasco da Gama: 1924, 1929

External links

1904 births
1930 FIFA World Cup players
1980 deaths
Footballers from Rio de Janeiro (city)
Brazilian footballers
Brazil international footballers
CR Vasco da Gama players
Association football defenders